The official results of the Women's 20 km Walk at the 2001 World Championships in Edmonton, Alberta, Canada, held on Thursday 9 August 2001.

Medalists

Abbreviations
All times shown are in hours:minutes:seconds

Records

Intermediates

Final ranking

See also
 1998 Women's European Championships 10km Walk (Budapest)
 2000 Women's Olympic 20km Walk (Sydney)
 2001 Race Walking Year Ranking
 2002 Women's European Championships 20km Walk (Munich)
 2004 Women's Olympic 20km Walk (Athens)

References
 Results
 IAAF
 Die Leichtathletik-Statistik-Seite

W
Racewalking at the World Athletics Championships
2001 in women's athletics